Liina Brunelle (born October 12, 1978) is an Estonian-born French actress.

Although born in Estonia, Russian is her first language. Apart from Russian, she speaks French, English, Swedish, and German.

Cinema
 2005 : Paris, je t'aime, by Olivier Assayas, Frédéric Auburtin and Sylvain Chomet
 2006 : Madame Irma, by Didier Bourdon
 2007 : Eden Log, by Franck Vestiel
 2007 : Modern Love, by Stéphane Kazandjian
 2008 : Le Missionnaire, by Roger Delattre
 2008 : Celle que j'aime, by Élie Chouraqui

Television
 2004 : Advertisement for Société Générale directed by Gérard Jugnot
 2005 : La Légende vraie de la tour Eiffel, by Simon Brook
 2005 : Advertisement for Mediavista directed by Pascal Sid and Julien Lacombe
 2006 : Le Soiring, comic show for TPS Star
 2008 : Drôle de Noël !, by Nicolas Picard
 2008 : R.I.S, police scientifique, by Klaus Biedermann

Theatre
 2001 : A Marriage Proposal (in Russian), by Anton Chekhov
 2006 : Theatre experiences : Crime and Punishment by Fyodor Dostoyevsky, Miss Julie by August Strindberg, The Tidings Brought To Mary by Paul Claudel
 2007 : Richard III n'aura pas lieu, by Matei Vișniec, directed by David Sztulman in the Théâtre du Gymnase : Tania (female main role)
 2008 : Richard III n'aura pas lieu in the Ciné 13 Théâtre

Education
 2004 - 2007 : Theatre education in the Cours Simon (Paris)

External links
 Official website of Liina Brunelle
 Website of the Cours Simon
 

1978 births
Living people
French film actresses
French television actresses
French stage actresses
French people of Estonian descent
People from Kohtla-Järve